Disoidemata osmophora is a moth of the subfamily Arctiinae first described by George Hampson in 1900. It is found in Mexico.

References

Lithosiini